Atil was the capital of Khazaria from the 8th–10th centuries.

Atil or Atıl may also refer to:

Atıl İnaç (born 1975), Turkish film director 
Atıl Kutoğlu (born 1968), Turkish fashion designer
Atil, Sonora, Mexico, a small town
Atil Municipality, containing the town 

Turkish masculine given names